Kevin Hyland, OBE (born 1963) was the United Kingdom’s first Independent Anti-Slavery Commissioner, leading efforts to tackle slavery and human trafficking. He left the post in May 2018 and was succeeded by Dame Sara Thornton. He is the Chair of IHRB's Leadership Group for Responsible Recruitment, collaboration between leading companies and expert organisations to drive positive change in the way that migrant workers are recruited. He was formerly head of the London Metropolitan Police Service’s Human Trafficking Unit.

Police career
Hyland was a police officer for 30 years until retiring from the force as a detective inspector in 2014. As a detective Hyland specialised in various crimes throughout his policing career including homicide, gun crime, anti-corruption and then human trafficking and slavery. When working as a senior investigating officer, Hyland was responsible for the convictions of a large number of international organised crime groups, which included conducting multi-national JITs (joint investigation teams) bi-lateral prosecutions various criminal offences including money laundering, corruption, sexual exploitation and human trafficking.

In 2010 Hyland was appointed as the lead for the London Metropolitan Police’s Human Trafficking Unit. During Hyland’s tenure the London Metropolitan Police saw an increase in victim identifications and successful prosecutions of traffickers. He retired from the MPS in 2014 with the title of Detective Inspector, after some 30 years of service, in order to accept the position of "anti-slavery tsar".

Independent Anti-Slavery Commissioner
The creation of an Independent Commissioner is one of the main provisions of the UK's Modern Slavery Act 2015. Hyland was appointed to the role in November 2014 and acted as 'designate' Commissioner until the Bill received Royal Assent in March 2015, when he became Commissioner. He resigned in May 2018.

The role complements the existing role of Victims' Commissioner to ensure that modern slavery issues are tackled in a coordinated and effective manner across the UK. He will work closely with law enforcement agencies, local authorities, third sector organisations and internationally to encourage good practice in the identification of victims and the prevention, detection, investigation and prosecution of modern slavery crimes, including international collaboration. The role requires published annual reports for Parliamentary scrutiny. 
 
Kevin Hyland alleged that young children are made to do begging, pickpocketing and shoplifting in a manner similar to what happens in the novel, Oliver Twist by Charles Dickens.  Hyland maintains 151 convictions for slavery-related offences occurred in 2014 which he felt was far too few. Hyland claims police are doing too little to prevent contemporary slavery in the UK:

Hyland wanted police forces to make dealing with slavery "one of the highest priorities".

In 2016 Hyland urged members of the public in London to report any brothels and flats used for human trafficking. He highlighted risk of labour exploitation on high streets in car washes and nail bars. He also called on ministers to deport foreign diplomats found to be keeping staff in slave conditions, and to implement reforms intended to make it easier for victims to escape abusive employers.

In 2015 he led efforts for inclusion of human trafficking and modern slavery in the 15-year UN Sustainable Development Goals. This was secured as SDG 8.7 on the final day of negotiations at the UN in New York in the summer of 2015. This has resulted in many global efforts focussed on fighting modern slavery and human trafficking, including Alliance 8.7, an initiative led by the International Labour Organisation.

Santa Marta Group
Hyland helped to establish the Santa Marta Group, a body comprising international law enforcement agencies, civil society, NGOs and the Catholic Church.

The Group was launched by Pope Francis at the Vatican in April 2014, and is named after the Papal residence, where delegates stayed during the first meeting. At the launch Pope Francis described human trafficking as "an open wound on the body of contemporary society; a crime against humanity".

The Group was developed by the Catholic Bishops' Conference of England and Wales in collaboration with the London Metropolitan Police and is led by Cardinal Vincent Nichols, the Archbishop of Westminster.

Honours
Hyland was appointed Officer of the Order of the British Empire (OBE) for "services to Combating Human Trafficking" in the 2015 New Year Honours List.

References

External links

 "Commissioner signs trafficking declaration at the Vatican", crimeandjustice.co.uk, 4 October 2014; archived 19 January 2015

Metropolitan Police officers
Modern slavery in the United Kingdom
Human trafficking in the United Kingdom
Officers of the Order of the British Empire
1963 births
Living people
British people of Irish descent
British Roman Catholics
Date of birth missing (living people)
Place of birth missing (living people)